The 2023 Aurora Borealis Cup playoffs or the 2023 Naisten Liiga playoffs is the postseason tournament of the 2022–23 season of the Naisten Liiga. The tournament began on 25 February and the Aurora Borealis Cup will be awarded no later than 25 March 2023.

Kiekko-Espoo were the reigning Aurora Borealis Cup champions after winning the 2022 Naisten Liiga playoffs. Following the conclusion of the 2022–23 regular season, HIFK and KalPa were the favorites for the 2023 Aurora Borealis Cup finals.

Bracket

Quarterfinals
The best-of-five quarterfinals began on Saturday, 25 February and concluded on Satuday, 4 March. The top eight teams from the regular season qualified for the quarterfinal round. Games for three of the four series were scheduled to be played on 25 and 26 February, and 1, 4, and 5 March, with home ice advantage granted to the higher seeded teams for the first, third, and potential fifth games. The HIFK Helsinki versus Kärpät Oulu series was scheduled to be played on 25 and 26 February, and 1, 2, and 5 March with home ice advantage granted to HIFK for the first, second, and potential fifth game.

(1) HIFK vs. (8) Kärpät
HIFK Helsinki claimed the first seed, even though they tied KalPa Kuopio with 93 points, by virtue of a higher goal difference, marking the first regular season victory in team history. Led by Michaela Pejzlová, who was the regular season top point scorer with 82 points, HIFK was an offensive powerhouse; four HIFK players finished the season ranked in the league top-ten for scoring: Pejzlová, Julia Liikala (66 points), Emilia Vesa (53 points), and Clara Rozier (49 points). The team also benefitted from excellent goaltending, as starting netminder Kiia Lahtinen's 1.33 goals against average (GAA) ranked first of all goaltenders playing at least one-third of their team's minutes and her 93.6 save percentage (S-%) placed second of all starters in the league.

Oulun Kärpät struggled in the regular season, winning just seven games in regulation time and amassing a disappointing 28 points on the season to earn the eighth seed. Their totals represented a sharp decline from the previous season, in which they had claimed sixteen regulation wins and collected 52 points. Oona Havana led the team in scoring for the second consecutive season and ranked eighteenth in the league overall with 36 points in 36 games played; Havana was supported by the production of Emma Ekoluoma, who ranked 41st in the league with 24 points, and Tilli Keränen, who ranked 46th in the league with 22 points. After the 1A of Kärpät's goaltending tandem, Johanna Oksman, opted not to play in the 2022–23 season, goaltender Kati Asikainen was left with the most substantial game load in the league – she played in 29 games during the season. The increased time in net was taxing and Asikainen posted middling statistics, with an 89.4 S-% and 3.65 GAA. 

HIFK and Kärpät faced one another four times during the 2022–23 season, all four games resulting in decisive victories for HIFK.

The teams last met in the postseason during the semifinals of the 2022 Aurora Borealis Cup playoffs, which HIFK won in three games. 

HIFK swept their quarterfinal series against Kärpät, scoring a total of 26 goals and holding Kärpät scoreless across all three games. Michaela Pejzlová led all players in scoring with eleven points (6+5), followed by Emilia Vesa (3+7) and Sanni Vanhanen (5+3). Ten HIFK players scored a goal in the series: Pejzlová (6), Vanhanen (5), Vesa (3), Clara Rozier (3), Julia Liikala (2), Karoliina Rantamäki (2), Siiri Yrjölä (2), Johanna Kemppainen (1), Erica Korhonen (1), and Nenna Mehtonen (1). Goaltender Kiia Lahtinen recorded two shutouts and backup netminder Iina Kuusela recorded one.

(2) KalPa vs. (7) TPS
KalPa Kuopio secured the second seed despite tying HIFK with 93 points due to a lower goal difference. They were propelled by the elite production of left winger Elisa Holopainen, the regular season goal scoring champion, who scored 41 goals and 34 assists (75 points) in 28 regular season games before an injury in late January ended her season prematurely and kept her out of the playoffs entirely. Other major contributors to KalPa’s scoring were Jenna Kaila, who tallied 28 goals and 31 assists (59 points), and 50-point earners Jenna Hietala (29+21) and Johanna Juutilainen (14+36). Goaltender Tiina Ranne was stalwart in net, posting the best save percentage of all goaltenders playing at least one-third of their team's minutes, at 93.8%, and the second-best goals against average, at 1.67, across twenty games.

TPS Turku claimed the seventh seed with 14 regulation wins and 49 total points in their fifth Naisten Liiga season. The team had nine players who scored twenty points or more, including centre Pauliina Salonen (23+17) and Czech winger Tereza Pištěková (14+26) who both ranked in the top twenty players for points. Notable blue liners included offensive-defenders Anni Timonen (6+16) and Emmi Mourujärvi (6+14), and team performance noticeably improved when French stay-at-home defender Raphaëlle Grenier, who was held to 19 games played due to injury, was in the lineup.  Number one goaltender from the 2021–22 season Erica Jaskari was sidelined for the entire season and backup netminders Sari Saarinen and Tea Koljonen struggled with the added game load; both posted save percentages in the eighties and goals against average above 3.35 on the season.

KalPa swept all four matches in the season series with TPS, though their first meeting was pushed to the shootout before a goal from Liisa Kastikainen concluded the game in KalPa’s favor.

KalPa and TPS had never met in the playoffs prior to this series.

KalPa won the series in three games. However, unlike the dramatically lopsided HIFK vs. Kärpät series, two of three games in this series ended with a goal difference of just one. In the first game, Susanna Viitala opened scoring on what would stand as TPS’ only goal of the match, as it was followed by four KalPa goals from Sanni Rantala, Salla Rantanen, Jenna Hietala, and Jenna Kaila; Johanna Juutilainen earned assists on three of the four goals. Scoring in the second match began with three goals on TPS goaltender Suvi Saarinen in under a minute, starting just after the six and half minute mark with a delayed penalty goal by Johanna Juutilainen and quickly followed by unassisted goals from Veera Paroinen and Tanja Koljonen; Saarinen was replaced in net by Mila Houni following Koljonen's goal. TPS managed to come within one goal of KalPa two times as the match went on, notching goals from Tereza Pištěková, Heli Allinen, Emmi Mourujärvi, and Raphaëlle Grenier, but KalPa held their lead with goals scored by Hietala and Rantanen. The series concluded on the most balanced game of the three – though TPS never held the lead, they kept the score at a tie for nearly fifteen minutes and played a majority of the game trailing KalPa by just one goal. TPS third goaltender Tanja Koljonen was selected to backstop the team and Viitala, Uche Udeh, and Anni Timonen lit the lamp for TPS. KalPa tallied two power play goals, scored by Kaila and Johanna Juutilainen, and two regular strength goals, by Hietala and Kaisla Kortelainen, to punch their ticket to the semifinals.

(3) K-Espoo vs. (6) Kuortane 
Defending Aurora Borealis Cup champions Kiekko-Espoo ranked third in the regular season, ending the team’s reign as the top team in the regular season over the previous four seasons, due in large part to the dramatic number of player departures following the 2022 Finnish Championship, which included six of the previous season’s top-ten point scorers and team captain Minttu Tuominen. In their absence, several young players staged breakout seasons: Anni-Elina Montonen ranked tenth in the league with 21 goals and 21 assists for 42 points, Sofia Nuutinen ranked fifteenth with 25 assists and 39 points, and seventeen year old Julia Schalin tallied 17 goals and 30 points. Newly-appointed captain Emmi Rakkolainen was the team’s top performing centre, posting 38 points in 29 games played. Starting netminder Tiia Pajarinen, MVP of the 2021 Aurora Borealis Cup playoffs, ranked second for goals against average of all goaltenders playing at least one-third of their team's minutes, at 1.66 GAA, and fifth for save percentage, at 92.1%, across 21 games played.

Team Kuortane secured the sixth seed on account of their excellent goaltending. Despite being the lowest scoring team to qualify for the playoffs – they amassed just 91 goals on the season – Team Kuortane finished the season with a positive goal difference and won as many games as they lost (wins+OTW=18; losses+OTL=18). Emilia Kyrkkö played 24 games in net and faced nearly 700 shots while maintaining a 92.5 save percentage, good for fourth of all goaltenders playing at least one-third of their team's minutes, and 2.35 goals against average, which ranked sixth. Backup entminter Venla Varis played ten games and recorded a save percentage of 90.1%, 2.63 goals against average, and a shutout. Team Kuortane’s top scorers were Nea Tervonen (32 points), Sinna Varjonen (21 points), Neea Pelkonen (19 points), and Sofianna Sundelin, who scored 10 goals and 8 assists in just fourteen games played after injury kept her sidelined for much of the season.

Kiekko-Espoo and Team Kuortane faced one another four times during the 2022–23 regular season; Kiekko-Espoo won three of the four matches.

The teams last met in the 2021 Aurora Borealis Cup quarterfinals, which Kiekko-Espoo swept in two games.

Kiekko-Espoo won the series in four games.

(4) HPK vs. (5) Ilves

HPK won the series in four games.

Quarterfinal statistics

Scoring leaders
The following players led the league in quarterfinal points at the conclusion of the quarterfinals on Saturday, 4 March.

Note: This table includes games played during the quarterfinals only. For cumulative playoff totals, see Player statistics.

The following skaters were the top point scorers of teams not represented in the scoring leader table at the conclusion of the quarterfinals on 4 March 2023, noted with their overall league scoring rank:

 21. Sofianna Sundelin (F), Kuortane: 4 GP, 3 G, 1 A, 5 Pts, 2 PIM
 27. Heli Allinen (D), TPS: 3 GP, 1 G, 2 A, 3 Pts, 0 PIMTereza Pištěková (F), TPS: 3 GP, 1 G, 2 A, 3 Pts, 0 PIM

Leading goaltenders
The following goaltenders had played at least two periods of a quarterfinal match at the conclusion of quarterfinals on Saturday, 4 March, sorted by save percentage.

Note: This table includes games played during the semifinals only. For cumulative playoff totals, see Player statistics.

Semifinals
The best-of-five semifinals will began on Tuesday, 7 March and concluded on Sunday, 12 March 2023.

(1) HIFK vs. (4) HPK

(2) KalPa vs. (3) K-Espoo

Third seed Kiekko-Espoo unexpectedly won the series against second seed KalPa in four games, proceeding to their fifth consecutive Aurora Borealis Cup finals.

Semifinal statistics

Scoring leaders 
The following players led the league in points scored in the semifinals at the conclusion of the series on Sunday, 12 March.

Note: This table includes games played during the semifinals only. For cumulative totals, see Player statistics.

Bronze medal game 
The Aurora Borealis Cup bronze medal game was played on Saturday, 18 March 2023. KalPa won the game and claimed the fourth Finnish Champioship bronze medal in team history.

Finals 
The best-of-five Finnish Championship finals ( or ) or grand finale began on Saturday, 18 March and the Aurora Borealis Cup will be awarded no later than 25 March 2023.

Player statistics

Scoring leaders 
The following players led the league in playoff points at the conclusion of games played Sunday, 19 March.

Leading goaltenders 
The following goaltenders had played at least thirty minutes or half a playoff match at the conclusion of games played Sunday, 19 March, sorted by save percentage.

References

Game references

External links
Official statistics from the Finnish Ice Hockey Association 

Naisten Liiga (ice hockey) playoffs